Seeking Whom He May Devour (lit. "The Inside-out Man") is a crime novel by French writer Fred Vargas. As with many of Vargas' novels in English translation, the English title bears no relationship to the original. In this case, it is a biblical quotation from the First Epistle of Peter (5:8): Be sober, be vigilant; because your adversary the devil, as a roaring lion, walketh about, seeking whom he may devour.  The French title is more apposite, referring to an aspect of the werewolf myth that plays some part in the story, that the werewolf when in human form is wearing the wolfskin inside out.  An alleged werewolf may therefore be exposed by cutting (generally fatally), when wolf-hair will be seen in the wound.

In 2004, it became the second of her novels to be translated into English (by award-winning translator David Bellos), and was shortlisted for the Crime Writers' Association Gold Dagger.

1999 French novels
Novels by Fred Vargas
French mystery novels